Ian Robert Twitchin (22 January 1952 – 3 December 2017) was an English professional footballer who spent his entire professional career with Torquay United, making 400 appearances in the Football League. He later played for Minehead and Newton Abbot Spurs (where he was player-manager). He died on 3 December 2017.

References

1952 births
2017 deaths
English footballers
Torquay United F.C. players
Minehead A.F.C. players
Newton Abbot Spurs A.F.C. players
Newton Abbot Spurs A.F.C. managers
English Football League players
Association football fullbacks
Association football midfielders
English football managers
People from Teignmouth